Dhaliwal Bet  is a village in Kapurthala district of Punjab State, India. The village is administrated by a Sarpanch who is an elected representative of village as per the constitution of India and Panchayati raj (India).

Demography 
According to the report published by Census India in 2011, Dhaliwal Bet has a total number of 747 houses and population of 3,370 of which include 1,732 males and 1,638 females.  Literacy rate of Dhaliwal Bet is 73.54%, lower than state average of 75.84%.  The population of children under the age of 6 years is 312 which is  9.26% of total population of Dhaliwal Bet, and child sex ratio is approximately  835, lower than state average of 846.

Caste  
The village has schedule caste (SC) constitutes 35.07% of total population of the village and it doesn't have any Schedule Tribe (ST) population,

Population data

Air travel connectivity 
The closest airport to the village is Sri Guru Ram Dass Jee International Airport.

Notable people 
1. Late Sardar Karnail Singh Dhaliwal, Patti Ballo Ki

2. Late Sherriff Sandeep Singh Dhaliwal

Villages in Kapurthala

External links
  Villages in Kapurthala
 Kapurthala Villages List

References

Villages in Kapurthala district